Siman-Tov Ganeh (1924–1968) was an Israeli soldier who was rewarded with the Hero of Israel.

Biography
Siman-Tov Ganeh was born in the Old City of Jerusalem to a Georgian-Jewish family, son of a member of the Jewish Battalions and a volunteer in the British army's Expeditionary Force during the Second World War. When the 1936–1939 Arab revolt broke out, his family was forced to leave the Old City and move to Zikhron Moshe. As a boy he worked in a cigarette factory, and in 1941 his father fell captive in Crete. He also served in the Royal Navy, and served on supply ships. In April 1946, he was discharged and worked as a taxi driver shortly before joining the Lehi underground movement.

Ganeh joined the 8th Brigade at the beginning of the 1948 Arab–Israeli War and served in the 89th Battalion. In November 1948, he participated in the Battle of Iraq Suwaydan, in which he continued to treat the wounded and respond to the shooting while mortally wounded and under heavy fire. For his part in the operation, he was awarded the Hero of Israel medal.

After the battle, Siman-Tov's two legs were cut off and replaced with prosthetic legs. Following the war he studied carpentry and worked for a while as a taxi driver. He got married in 1950 and was a father of three. His middle son was named Ma'agan, after being born on the day Ganeh was saved from the Ma'agan disaster which he had witnessed. During the Six-Day War he volunteered to gather soldiers from transportation stations. In 1967, he began to work as a contractor in military camps. In March 1968, he was hit by an old shell that was ignited from the heat and was killed. After his death, mourning orders were held in IDF units.

References

1924 births
1968 deaths
Jews in Mandatory Palestine
Israeli taxi drivers
Lehi (militant group)
Israeli Mizrahi Jews
Israeli people of Georgian-Jewish descent
Recipients of the Medal of Valor (Israel)